The Slumdon Bridge is a collaborative EP by English singer-songwriter, Ed Sheeran and American rapper, Yelawolf. It was released on 14 February 2012 as a free digital download in the United Kingdom. The second track of the EP, "You Don't Know (For Fuck's Sake)", was released as a free download via Sheeran's Twitter page and on numerous hip hop websites on 24 January, as the lead single.

A trailer for the project was released, showing both artists in the studio recording the EP. The EP was released in the United States on 24 April 2012 via iTunes under Interscope Records.

Track listing
 All tracks produced by Jake Gosling.

References

2012 EPs
Yelawolf EPs
Ed Sheeran EPs
Albums produced by Ed Sheeran
Albums produced by Jake Gosling
Warner Music Group EPs
Self-released EPs
Collaborative albums